Estadio El Bayu is a football stadium in Pola de Siero, Siero, and is the home of Club Siero.

History

The stadium was built in 2006 after the demolition of Estadio Luis Miranda, the old stadium in the village, for building the A-64 highway.

It was inaugurated on 31 October 2006 with a friendly football game between the Spain women's national team and a team composed by Spanish players.

The stadium has only one stand with capacity for 4,500 spectators and it is currently used by all the teams of the four clubs located at Pola de Siero.

References

External links
El Bayu at estadiosdeespana.com

Football venues in Asturias
Sports venues completed in 2006